Similosodus is a genus of longhorn beetles of the subfamily Lamiinae, containing the following species:

subgenus Similosodus
 Similosodus atrofasciatus (Pic, 1934)
 Similosodus birmanicus (Breuning, 1938)
 Similosodus castaneus (Aurivillius, 1911)
 Similosodus chujoi Breuning, 1982
 Similosodus flavicornis Breuning, 1961
 Similosodus fuscosignatus (Breuning, 1939)
 Similosodus papuanus (Breuning, 1940)
 Similosodus torui Holzschuh, 1989
 Similosodus unifasciatus (Pic, 1934)
 Similosodus ursulus (Pascoe, 1866)
 Similosodus verticalis (Pascoe, 1865)

subgenus Transverseosodus
 Similosodus bedoci (Pic, 1926)
 Similosodus burckhardti Hüdepohl, 1996
 Similosodus coomani (Pic, 1926)
 Similosodus palavanicus (Breuning, 1939)
 Similosodus persimilis (Breuning, 1942)
 Similosodus samaranus (Heller, 1926)
 Similosodus signatus (Breuning, 1939)
 Similosodus strandi (Breuning, 1938)
 Similosodus transversefasciatus (Breuning, 1938)
 Similosodus ziczac (McKeown, 1942)

subgenus Venosodus
 Similosodus variolosus (Breuning, 1938)
 Similosodus venosus (Pascoe, 1867)

References

 
Pteropliini